Cody Matthew Martin (born September 4, 1989) is an American former professional baseball pitcher. He previously played in Major League Baseball (MLB) for the Atlanta Braves, Oakland Athletics and Seattle Mariners. Prior to being drafted by the Braves, Martin played college baseball at Gonzaga University, where he was named a First Team All-American.

Early life
Cody Martin was born on September 4, 1989 to Debbie (Bonds) and Chuck Martin. Chuck was a minor league baseball player in the Atlanta Braves organization from 1984 to 1985.

Amateur career
Martin went to Dos Palos High School in Dos Palos, California. He played for the school's baseball team, and appeared in the Fresno City/County All-Star Game. He also played for the school's football team, but stopped playing football after his junior season to focus on baseball.

Martin attended Gonzaga University, where he played college baseball for the Gonzaga Bulldogs baseball team in the West Coast Conference of the National Collegiate Athletic Association's (NCAA) Division I. He recorded 15 saves as a relief pitcher for Gonzaga in his freshman and sophomore seasons, setting the Gonzaga single-season record with nine in his freshman year. As a junior, Martin served as a starting pitcher, leading Gonzaga with five wins. The Minnesota Twins selected Martin in the 20th round (615th overall) of the 2010 Major League Baseball (MLB) Draft, but he did not sign, returning to Gonzaga for his senior season in 2011. Returning to relief, Martin was named a First Team All-American by Baseball America and Second Team American Baseball Coaches Association All-American after his senior season, in which he led NCAA's Division I in earned run average and batting average against.

Professional career

Atlanta Braves
The Atlanta Braves selected Martin in the seventh round (236th overall) of the 2011 MLB Draft. He signed with the Braves and made his professional debut that season with the Danville Braves of the Rookie-level Appalachian League. He was promoted to the Rome Braves of the Class-A South Atlantic League later that season. He began the 2012 season with the Lynchburg Hillcats of the Class-A Advanced Carolina League. Transitioning back into a starting pitcher, Martin was named the Carolina League's player of the week in consecutive weeks, for the weeks ending July 1 and 8.

In 2013, Martin pitched for the Mississippi Braves of the Class AA Southern League and the Gwinnett Braves of the Class AAA International League. He played for Gwinnett in the 2014 season. Martin was invited to spring training in 2015, and made the Braves' Opening Day roster. He was optioned to Gwinnett on May 19, and recalled on June 1.

Oakland Athletics
On July 2, 2015, the Braves traded Martin to the Oakland Athletics for international slot number 53, worth $388,400. He was assigned to the Nashville Sounds of the Class AAA Pacific Coast League (PCL). He made his Athletics' debut on September 1, and was optioned back to Nashville the next day.

Seattle Mariners
Martin was claimed off waivers by the Seattle Mariners after the 2015 season. He began the 2016 season with the Tacoma Rainiers of the PCL and was promoted to the major leagues on June 2. The Mariners returned Martin to the minors two days later, before recalling him on July 30. He was optioned to the Rainiers on August 7. Martin made his first major league start of the season on August 16, and was sent to the minors on August 23. Martin finished the year at the major league level after he was recalled on September 12, upon the end of the Tacoma Rainiers season.

Martin was designated for assignment on January 11, 2017, and outrighted to Triple-A Tacoma on January 14.

Later career
On March 26, 2018, Martin signed with the Sugar Land Skeeters of the Atlantic League of Professional Baseball. On April 24, 2018, he was traded to the Kansas City T-Bones of the American Association. On May 19, the New York Mets purchased his contract from the T-Bones. He was released on September 10, 2018.

Post-playing career
On December 6, 2018, Martin announced his retirement from playing professional baseball, and that he had accepted a position as the new Northwest Area scout for the Atlanta Braves.

References

External links

1989 births
All-American college baseball players
Atlanta Braves players
Major League Baseball pitchers
Baseball players from California
Danville Braves players
Gonzaga Bulldogs baseball players
Gwinnett Braves players
Las Vegas 51s players
Living people
Lynchburg Hillcats players
Mississippi Braves players
Nashville Sounds players
Oakland Athletics players
People from Merced County, California
Rome Braves players
Seattle Mariners players
Tacoma Rainiers players